The 2014–15 Slovak Extraliga season was the 22nd season of the Slovak Extraliga, the highest level of ice hockey in Slovakia.

Teams
The following teams are participating in the 2014–15 season. The HK Orange 20 is a project for preparation of the Slovakia junior ice hockey team for the IIHF World U20 Championship. The team do not play complete regular season and cannot promote to the playoffs or get relegated. First 8 teams in table after the regular season (56 games) will promote to the playoffs.

Regular season

Relegation series
Relegation series will be played between MsHK Žilina, the 10th team in regular season, and HC 07 Detva, the winner of 1.liga. The winner of best-of-seven series will play in Extraliga in 2015–16 season.

PlayOut

Žilina wins the series 4-1 and will play in 2015–16 Slovak Extraliga season

Playoffs
The seeding in Play-off is based on the ranking in Regular season. All Play-off rounds are played in the best-of-seven format, with the higher seeded team having the home advantage for the possible seventh game.

Playoff bracket

Final rankings

External links
Official website
Season statistics

Slovak Extraliga seasons
2014–15 in European ice hockey leagues
2014–15 in Slovak ice hockey leagues